The 2023 ACC Men's Premier Cup will be the first edition of the Men's Premier Cup. This tournament is  the qualification pathway towards Asia Cup 2023, it is scheduled to be hosted by Nepal, in April and May 2023. The winner of the tournament will qualify for the 2023 Asia Cup. Matches will be played in format of ODI and List A as per the participating team's status.

Groups 

 # = Advanced from 2023 ACC Men's Challenger Cup

Group stage

Group A 
<onlyinclude>Fixtures

Group B 
Fixtures

Knockout Stage

Semi-finals

Final

References

Asian Cricket Council competitions

External links 

International cricket competitions in 2023